"She Ain't Pretty" is a single by Canadian rock band The Northern Pikes, from their 1990 album Snow in June. It is the song for which the Pikes are best known.

The song was written by Bryan Potvin. It describes the singer's infatuation with a physically attractive woman, and his dismay at learning that she is a horrible person—a "model from Hell". The genesis of the song was Potvin watching an episode of Rhoda where a character says "I'm not really beautiful, I just look that way."

The song was the sixth-most played Cancon song in Canada of 1990.

Charts

Year-end charts

Critical reception
In 1991, the song was nominated for the Juno Award for Single of the Year. Its music video, which integrated claymation and early use of morphing, and which the National Post described as "fantastic", was nominated for a Juno.

References

1990 songs
1990 singles
The Northern Pikes songs